Beaverhead County is the largest county by area in the U.S. state of Montana. As of the 2020 census, the population was 9,371. Its county seat is Dillon. The county was founded in 1865.

Much of the perimeter of the county is the Continental Divide, including its entire border with the state of Idaho. The divide heads east into Montana at the county border with Ravalli County, between Lost Trail Pass and Chief Joseph Pass.

History
The county name is derived from a rock formation, which the Shoshone described as being shaped like a beaver's head.

The original county seat was the gold-mining town of Bannack. In 1881 it was moved to Dillon.

Geography
It is the largest county in Montana by area.
Beaverhead impact structure is in the area.
The Big Hole River (formerly called Wisdom River) runs through the county.

Adjacent counties

 Ravalli County - northwest
 Deer Lodge County - north
 Silver Bow County - north
 Madison County - east
 Fremont County, Idaho - southeast
 Clark County, Idaho - south
 Lemhi County, Idaho - west

Major highways

National protected areas

 Beaverhead National Forest (part)
 Big Hole National Battlefield
 Nez Perce National Historical Park (part)
 Red Rock Lakes National Wildlife Refuge

Politics
Beaverhead is a powerfully Republican county. It has not voted for a Democratic Presidential candidate since 1936.

Demographics

2000 census
As of the 2000 United States census, there were 9,202 people, 3,684 households, and 2,354 families living in the county. The racial makeup of the county was 95.86% White, 0.18% Black or African American, 1.46% Native American, 0.18% Asian, 0.04% Pacific Islander, 1.09% from other races, and 1.18% from two or more races. 2.67% of the population were Hispanic or Latino of any race. 16.7% were of German, 14.9% English, 10.7% Irish, 9.0% American and 7.2% Norwegian ancestry.

There were 3,684 households, out of which 30.10% had children under the age of 18 living with them, 54.80% were married couples living together, 6.20% had a female householder with no husband present, and 36.10% were non-families. 29.70% of all households were made up of individuals, and 11.00% had someone living alone who was 65 years of age or older. The average household size was 2.36 and the average family size was 2.95.

The county population contained 24.60% under the age of 18, 11.90% from 18 to 24, 25.10% from 25 to 44, 24.90% from 45 to 64, and 13.60% who were 65 years of age or older. The median age was 38 years. For every 100 females there were 105.00 males. For every 100 females age 18 and over, there were 102.50 males.

The median income for a household in the county was $28,962, and the median income for a family was $38,971. Males had a median income of $26,162 versus $18,115 for females. The per capita income for the county was $15,621. About 12.80% of families and 17.10% of the population were below the poverty line, including 20.30% of those under age 18 and 12.20% of those age 65 or over.

2010 census
As of the 2010 United States census, there were 9,246 people, 4,014 households, and 2,383 families living in the county. The racial makeup of the county was 94.8% white, 1.4% American Indian, 0.4% Pacific islander, 0.4% Asian, 0.2% black or African American, 1.2% from other races, and 1.6% from two or more races. Those of Hispanic or Latino origin made up 3.7% of the population. In terms of ancestry, 26.5% were German, 23.9% were English, 15.4% were Irish, 7.9% were Norwegian, 6.5% were Scottish, and 3.4% were American.

Of the 4,014 households, 23.8% had children under the age of 18 living with them, 49.9% were married couples living together, 6.4% had a female householder with no husband present, 40.6% were non-families, and 33.0% of all households were made up of individuals. The average household size was 2.19 and the average family size was 2.79. The median age was 42.0 years.

The median income for a household in the county was $38,264 and the median income for a family was $53,036. Males had a median income of $35,568 versus $27,314 for females. The per capita income for the county was $21,110. About 10.8% of families and 15.0% of the population were below the poverty line, including 14.4% of those under age 18 and 6.0% of those age 65 or over.

Economy
Beaverhead County is one of the largest cattle and hay producing areas of Montana. Barrett's Minerals, one of the world's largest talc mines, calls Beaverhead County home. In 2009, Barrett Hospital and Healthcare was the largest private employer in the county.

Education
The University of Montana Western is in Dillon.

Communities

City
 Dillon (county seat)

Town
 Lima

Census-designated places

 Argenta
 Dell
 Dewey
 Glen
 Grant
 Jackson
 Lakeview
 Maverick Mountain
 Wisdom
 Wise River

Other unincorporated communities

 Apex
 Barretts
 Bond
 Dalys
 Elkhorn Hot Springs
 Ford
 Kidd
 Monida
 Polaris
 Red Rock

Former communities
 Armstead - flooded by Clark County Reservoir in 1964
 Bannack (presently a National Historic Monument and site of Bannack State Park)
 Hecla
 Lion City

Notable people
 Joseph Poindexter, later Territorial Governor of Hawaii, served as County Attorney here .
 Thomas Savage(1915-2003) spent his childhood and teen years on his family's ranch in Beaverhead County. His experiences there informed his best known novels, The Power of the Dog and The Sheep Queen .

See also
 List of lakes in Beaverhead County, Montana
 List of mountains in Beaverhead County, Montana
 National Register of Historic Places listings in Beaverhead County, Montana

References

External links
 Official page
 Chamber of Commerce page

 
1865 establishments in Montana Territory
Populated places established in 1865